Shadows & Dust is the sixth studio album by the Canadian death metal band Kataklysm.

Track listing

Personnel
Kataklysm
Maurizio Iacono - Vocals
Jean-François Dagenais - Guitar
Stephane Barbe - Bass
Max Duhamel - Drums

Production
Jean-François Dagenais - Produced, engineered and mixed
Yannick St-Amant - Additional engineering
Bernard Belley - Mastering
Maurizio Iacono - Lyrics
Alan Douches - Mastering (Re-Release)

References

External links
 Kataklysm - official website
 Nuclear Blast - official website
 Kataklysm - Shadows & Dust

2002 albums
Kataklysm albums
Nuclear Blast albums